Phổ Minh Temple (Chữ Hán: 普明寺) is a Buddhist temple in Tức Mặc village, 5 kilometres north of Nam Định city, Vietnam, the home town of the Trần dynasty.

History
According to official historical documents, the temple was built in 1262, west of the Trần dynasty's Trung Quang Palace. But according to steles at the temple, the bell of the temple was made since the Lý dynasty. The temple was possibly extensively renovated in 1305. Through many renovations, there still exist artistic relics from the Trần dynasty.

See also
 Four Great Treasures of Annam

External links
Thư viện Hoa Sen

Buddhist temples in Vietnam
Buildings and structures in Nam Định province